Alfred Bentley (15 September 1887 – 15 April 1940) was an English footballer who played as a centre-forward.

Biography 
Bentley was born in Alfreton, Derbyshire. He turned professional with Derby County in December 1906, joining for a £50 fee. During the 1908–09 season he was the top scorer of the Second Division with 24 goals, with a further 8 goals in FA Cup matches.

In May 1911 he signed for Bolton Wanderers for £1000, before moving to West Bromwich Albion for £500 in June 1913. He joined Burton Albion in May 1922. Bentley moved to his hometown club Alfreton Town in August 1924, before retiring from football in May 1926. He later worked in the steel industry and died in Alfreton in 1940.

References 

1887 births
1940 deaths
People from Alfreton
Footballers from Derbyshire
English footballers
Association football forwards
Derby County F.C. players
Bolton Wanderers F.C. players
West Bromwich Albion F.C. players
Burton Albion F.C. players
Alfreton Town F.C. players